The 2019 Varsity Cup was the 12th season of the Varsity Cup, the top competition in the annual Varsity Rugby series. It was played between 4 February and 22 April 2019 and featured nine university teams.

Competition rules and information

There were nine participating university teams in the 2019 Varsity Cup. They played each other once during the pool stage, either at home or away. Teams received four points for a win and two points for a draw. Bonus points were awarded to teams that scored four or more tries in a game, as well as to teams that lost a match by seven points or less. Teams were ranked by log points, then points difference (points scored less points conceded).

The top four teams after the pool stage qualified for the semifinals, which were followed by a final.

Teams

The teams that played in the 2019 Varsity Cup are:

Pool stage

Standings

The final log for the 2019 Varsity Cup was:

Matches

The following matches were played in the 2019 Varsity Cup:

Round one

Round two

Round three

Round four

Round five

Round six

Round seven

Round eight

Round nine

Play-offs

Semi-finals

Final

North v South match

References

2019
2019 in South African rugby union
2019 rugby union tournaments for clubs